People's Artist of the Russian Federation (Narodnyy artist Rossiyskoy Federatsii), also sometimes translated as National Artist of the Russian Federation, is an honorary and the highest title awarded to citizens of the Russian Federation, all outstanding in the performing arts, whose merits are exceptional in the sphere of the development of the performing arts (theatre, music, dance, circus, cinema, etc.).

It succeeded both the all-Soviet Union "People's Artist of the USSR" award (Народный артист СССР), and more directly the local republic's "People's Artist of the RSFSR" award (Народный артист РСФСР), after the dissolution of the Soviet Union. Now, the status of the People's Artist of the Russian Federation has risen above that of the earlier RSFSR award.

There are presently two levels to this award:
 The lower Honored Artist of Russia (Заслуженный артист Zasluzhenniy artist) also translates as "Meritorious Artist". This was equivalent to the earlier «Заслуженный артист РСФСР», which became «Заслуженный артист Российской Федерации».
 The higher People's Artist of Russia (Народный артист России, Narodny artist) is the highest honorary title of the Russian Federation for outstanding achievements in the field of theater, music, circus, vaudeville and film art.

Receiving the lower Honored... (Заслуженный, Zasluzhenniy artist) award makes the recipient eligible to receive the higher People's... (Народный, Narodny) award at a later time. For example, the light entertainment singer Sergei Georgievich Zakharov was awarded Honored Artist of the RSFSR (Заслуженный артист РСФСР) in 1988, then People's Artist of Russia (Народный артист России) in 1996.

Categories awarded
The awards may be issued to people working in the following fields:

 Teacher 
 Artist 
 Agronomist 
 Architect 
 Chemist 
 Miner 
 Veterinarian 
 Military Pilot 
 Military Expert 
 Military Navigator 
 Doctor 
 Geologist 
 Scientist 
 Land surveyor 
 Husbandry
 Inventor
 Designer 
 Forester
 Test Pilot
 Mechanic
 Metallurgist 
 Meteorologist 
 Border Guard 
 Community services worker 
 Foreign Service Employee 
 Health Worker
 Cultural Worker
 Forestry Worker 
 Oil & Gas Industry Worker 
 Employee of the Food Industry 
 Employee of the Aerospace Industry

Other professionals are open to attaining the title as well as those listed.

Gallery

People's Artist of the Russian Federation (list)

1992 

 Vadim Abdrashitov — film director
 Vera Alentova – actress
 Gennadi Bortnikov – actor
 Ivan Krasko – actor
 Yuri Lyubimov – actor
 Tamara Nosova – actress
 Tatiana Samoilova – actress
 Tatyana Vasilyeva – actress

1993 

 Lev Dodin – theatre director
 Pyotr Fomenko – film and theatre director
 Georgy Garanian – musician
 Boris Khimichev – actor
 Olga Ostroumova – actress
 Ruzhena Sikora – singer
 Sergei Solovyov – director
 Yevgeny Steblov – actor
 Olga Volkova – actress
 Irina Zhurina – singer

1994 

 Liya Akhedzhakova – actress
 Oleksandr Bondurianskyi – pianist
 Boris Novikov – actor
 Albert Filozov – actor
 Yevgeny Krylatov – composer
 Rimma Markova – actress
 Andrey Martynov – actor
 Irina Muravyova – actress
 Georgy Natanson – director
 Valery Nosik – actor
 Viktor Pavlov – actor
 Elvina Podchernikova-Elvorti – circus performer
 Aleksandr Porokhovshchikov – actor, director
 Viktor Alexejewitsch Romanko – bayan-virtuoso
 Boris Shcherbakov – actor
 Nina Usatova – actress
 Anatoly Vasilyev – actor
 Gennadi Yukhtin – actor
 Aleksei Zharkov – actor

1995 

 Nina Ananiashvili – ballet dancer
 Yevgeniya Glushenko – actress
 Dmitri Hvorostovsky – singer
 Igor Kostolevsky – actor
 Savva Kulish – director
 Gennady Pasko – painter
 Vladimir Rubin – composer
 Yevgeniya Simonova – actress
 Vladimir Verbitsky – conductor

1996 

 Svetlana Bezrodnaya – violinist
 Alexander Burdonsky – theater director
 Nikolai Burlyayev – actor
 Vyacheslav Dobrynin – composer, singer
 Valery Fokin – theatre director
 Valery Gergiev – conductor
 Nadezhda Gracheva – ballet dancer
 Igor Krutoy – composer
 Valery Leontiev – singer
 Tamara Miansarova – singer
 Yuriy Norshteyn – director
 Valery Polyansky – conductor
 Natalya Seleznyova – actress
 Nikolay Serebryakov – director
 Mikhail Svetin – actor
 Margarita Terekhova – actress
 Sergei Zakharov – singer

1997 

 Yuri Antonov – musician
 Victor Balashov – radio host
 Valery Lantratov- ballet dancer
 Alexander Lenkov – actor
 Alexander Malinin – musician
 Vladimir Matorin – singer
 Klara Novikova – actress
 Kirill Tikhonov – conductor

1998 

 Olga Barnet – actress
 Vitali Konyayev – actor
 Fuat Mansurov – conductor
 Sergey Migitsko – actor
 Yuri Nikolaev – TV and radio host, actor
 Maria Pakhomenko – singer
 Boris Plotnikov – actor
 Gennadi Poloka – actor, director
 Nina Ruslanova – actress
 Sergei Skripka – conductor
 Larisa Udovichenko – actress
 Emmanuil Vitorgan – actor

1999 

 Alla Bayanova – singer
 Andrei Chistyakov – conductor
 Valentin Dikul – circus performer
 Vladimir Ilyin – actor
 Alexander Gradsky – musician
 David Goloschekin – musician
 Nadezhda Kadysheva – singer
 Mikhail Kononov – actor
 Aristarkh Livanov – actor
 Lyudmila Polyakova – actress
 Andrey Makarevich – musician
 Tatyana Piletskaya – actress
 Joseph Raihelgauz – theatre director
 Alexey Rybnikov – composer
 Alexey Sheynin – actor
 Nikolai Sorokin – actor

2000s

2000 
 Ivan Bortnik – actor
 Tatyana Dogileva – actress
 Taisia Kornilova — circus performer
 Evgeny Brazhnik – conductor
 Aleksandr Misharin (screenwriter)
 Dmitry Nazarov – actor
 Emilyano Ochagaviya – actor
 Yuri Sarantsev – actor
 Alla Surikova – director

2001 
 Lev Borisov – actor
 Zakhar Bron – violinist
 Boris Bystrov – actor
 Lydia Davydova – singer
 Sergei Filin – ballet dancer
 Oleg Gazmanov – singer
 Boris Khmelnitsky – actor
 Georgi Movsesyan – composer
 Ilya Oleynikov – actor
 Yuriy Stoyanov – actor
 Slava Polunin – circus performer, actor
 Alexander Rosenbaum – musician
 Vladimir Steklov – actor
 Nikolay Tsiskaridze – ballet dancer
 Alexandra Zakharova – actress

2002 
 Olga Borodina – singer
 Gennady Gladkov – composer
 Boris Klyuyev – actor
 Tatyana Kravchenko – actress
 Vladimir Ponkin – conductor
 Stahan Rakhimov – singer
 Nikolay Rastorguyev – singer
 Karen Shakhnazarov – filmmaker
 Elena Yakovleva – actress
 Leonid Yakubovich – actor
 Alla Yoshpe – singer
 Ludmila Senchina – singer

2003 
 Kama Ginkas – theatre director
 Igor Kashintsev – actor
 Andrey Kovalchuk – sculptor
 Oleg Menshikov – actor
 Leonid Nechayev – director
 Viktor Rakov – actor
 Ilya Reznik – poet
 Andrei Smirnov – actor, director
 Zinovy Vysokovsky – actor
 Aleksandr Zatsepin – composer
 Mikhail Tanich – poet

2004 
 Oleg Anofriyev – actor, musician
 Igor Yuryevich Ivanov – actor
 Zinaida Ignatyeva – pianist
 Tamara Gverdtsiteli – singer
 Yevgeny Mironov – actor
 Alexander Mitta – director
 Alexander Morozov – composer
 Vladimir Nazarov – musician
 Andrey Smolyakov – actor
 Alexander Sokurov – director
 Maurice Yaklashkin – conductor
 Valeriya Zaklunna – actress

2005 
 Sergei Artsibashev – director
 Yuriy Nazarov – actor
 Sergei Roldugin – cellist
 Boris Romanov – actor
 Raisa Ryazanova – actress
 Valentin Smirnitsky – actor
 Svetlana Smirnova – actress
 Valentin Yudashkin – fashion designer
 Era Ziganshina – actress

2006 
 Svyatoslav Belza – critic
 Yuri Bosco – artist
 Aleksandr Galibin – actor
 Sergei Garmash – actor
 Vitaly Logvinovsky – actor
 Ulyana Lopatkina – ballet dancer
 Alexander Pyatkov – actor
 Angelina Vovk – actress
 Slava Zaitsev – fashion designer
 Marina Zudina – actress

2007 
 Irina Alfyorova – actress
 Aleksandr Domogarov – actor
 Margarita Fyodorova – pianist
 Vladimir Galouzine – singer
 Aleksei Guskov – actor
 Dmitry Kharatyan – actor
 Irina Rozanova – actress
 Diana Vishneva – ballet dancer
 Konstantin Lopushansky – director

2008 
 Sergey Bezrukov – actor
 Yuri Chernov – actor
 Philipp Kirkorov – singer
 Yulia Makhalina – ballet dancer
 Anna Netrebko – singer

2009 
 Maria Alexandrova – ballet dancer
 Nikolay Baskov – singer
 Alexey Buldakov – actor
 Oleg Mityaev – musician
 Anatoly Mukasei – cinematographer
 Valentina Telichkina – actress
 Roman Viktyuk – actor, director

2010s

2010 
 Irina Allegrova – singer
 Vladimir Khotinenko – actor, director
 Dmitry Malikov – musician
 Vladimir Mashkov – actor
 Aleksei Serebryakov – actor
 Vyacheslav Spesivtsev – actor
 Alexander Buinov – singer

2011 
 Fyodor Dobronravov – actor
 Vera Glagoleva – actress and film director
 Andrei Khrzhanovsky – film director
 Denis Matsuev – pianist
 Boris Nevzorov – actor, director
 Irma Nioradze – ballet dancer

2012 
 Dmitry Gudanov – ballet dancer
 Konstantin Khabensky – actor
 Chulpan Khamatova – actress
 Bedros Kirkorov – singer

2013 
 Nikolai Chindyajkin – actor
 Nikolai Lugansky – pianist
 Natalya Gvozdikova – actress
 Lev Prygunov – actor
 Igor Sklyar – actor
 Aleksandr Trofimov – actor
 Valeriya – singer

2014 
 Valery Khalilov – conductor, composer

2015 
 Arkady Arkanov – actor (posthumous)
 Kseniya Rappoport – actress

2016 
Marina Esipenko – actress
Nikolay Lazarev – actor
 Vladimir Nosik – actor
 Yuliya Rutberg – actress
Alexander Sladkovsky – conductor
 Igor Vernik – actor

2017 
Olga Pogodina – actress

2018
Viktoria Tereshkina – ballet dancer
 Nikolai Lebedev - actor
 Yekaterina Shipulina - principal dancer

2019
 Mikhail Porechenkov - actor 
 Angelina Vovk - presenter
 Igor Nikolayev - composer, singer

2020s

2020
 Anna Kovalchuk - actress
 Felix Korobov - conductor
 Aleksei Kravchenko - actor
 Maria Mironova - actress

2021
 Andrey Ilyin - actor 
 Galina Tyunina - actress
 Anita Tsoy - singer
 Natalia Vdovina - actress

2022
 Zuleikhan Bagalova - actress 
 Vladislav Vetrov - actor
 Victor Nizovoy - actor 
 Gleb Podgorodinsky - actor
 Olga Prokofieva - actress 
 Elena Sanayeva - actress

 Kamil Tukaev - actor
 Anatoly Firstov - actor 
 Anna Yakunina - actress
 Lev Klychkov - violinist
 Alexander Kniazev - cellist, organist
 Vadim Repin - violinist
 Diana Gurtskaya - singer
 Stas Mikhaylov - singer
 Grigory Leps - singer
 Igor Matvienko - composer, producer

See also 

Awards and decorations of the Russian Federation
Ministerial Awards of the Russian Federation
List of awards of independent services of the Russian Federation

References

 
Honorary titles of Russia
Russia